Manuel 'Manolo' Martínez Lara (born 15 June 1980) is a Spanish football coach and former player who played mainly as a defensive midfielder but also as a central defender. He is the current assistant manager of Gimnàstic de Tarragona.

He appeared in 228 Segunda División matches over ten seasons, scoring a combined five goals for Hércules, Gimnàstic (two stints), Tenerife and Recreativo. He also competed professionally in Greece.

Club career
Born in Bigastro, Alicante, Valencian Community, Martínez started his professional career with local Hércules CF, as a central defender. After years spent almost exclusively in Segunda División B he had a brief spell in La Liga, playing three games for Gimnàstic de Tarragona and being released in the 2007 winter transfer window; his debut in the latter competition consisted of 55 minutes of a 1–2 home loss against RC Celta de Vigo, on 10 September 2006.

Martínez then moved to CD Tenerife, where he reconverted into a defensive midfielder, greatly helping the club return to the top division in 2009 after a seven-year hiatus. In the subsequent season he played more often than not in his secondary position – stopper – and his performances were overall poorer, with the Canary Islands team being immediately relegated although it would only be certified in the last round against Valencia CF (0–1 away defeat).

In July 2010, aged 30, Martínez did not renew his Tenerife contract and agreed a two-year deal with another club in Segunda División, Recreativo de Huelva. On 10 July 2013 he moved abroad, joining Superleague Greece side Levadiakos FC.

In February 2014, Martínez suffered a knee injury which sidelined him for the remainder of the campaign. He returned to action in July, and subsequently signed a one-year contract with Gimnàstic; during his second spell at the Nou Estadi de Tarragona he was severely hindered by physical problems, and on 3 July 2017 he announced his retirement at the age of 37.

References

External links

1980 births
Living people
People from Vega Baja del Segura
Sportspeople from the Province of Alicante
Spanish footballers
Footballers from the Valencian Community
Association football defenders
Association football midfielders
Association football utility players
La Liga players
Segunda División players
Segunda División B players
Hércules CF players
Gimnàstic de Tarragona footballers
CD Tenerife players
Recreativo de Huelva players
Super League Greece players
Levadiakos F.C. players
Spanish expatriate footballers
Expatriate footballers in Greece
Spanish expatriate sportspeople in Greece